Timothy Frederick Ayers (born November 19, 1958) served as Mayor and City Commissioner of Springfield, Ohio from 1984-1990.  He previously served as the Legislative Message Clerk of the Ohio House of Representatives for the 113th General Assembly and Small Business Manager for the Nashville (TN) Chamber of Commerce.

Personal life
Timothy Ayers was born in Springfield, Ohio, the sixth child of Franklin Ayers and Betty Rae Basey.  He has 3 children.

His brother, former OSU Buckeyes head coach, Randy Ayers, has been a scout for the Brooklyn Nets professional basketball team since November 3, 2015.

Political life
 1980-1984, Assistant Clerk in the Ohio House of Representatives
 1984-1990, Mayor, Springfield, Ohio
 1990, Special Assistant, Ohio Department of Agriculture, administration of Governor Richard Celeste
 2000, Tennessee State Democrative Executive Committeemen

Notable achievements
 Assisted $2.5 million in loans to small businesses as the Small Business Manager of the Nashville Area Chamber of Commerce.
 Authored a $750,000 HUD grant to kick-start economic development activities in the historic neighborhood of Fisk University, Meharry Medical College and Tennessee State University in 2001. Since that grant, an additional $2.5 million of investment has poured into the area.
 Selected one of Kentucky's Minority Educator and Retention Award winners

References

1958 births
Living people
Mayors of places in Ohio
Capital University alumni
African-American mayors in Ohio
Politicians from Springfield, Ohio
Ohio Democrats
21st-century African-American people
20th-century African-American people